George Keller may refer to:
 George Keller (musician) (1953 - ), Norwegian musician and singer-/songwriter
 George Keller (architect) (1842–1935), American architect and engineer
 George Keller (academic) (1928–2007), American scholar of higher education
 George M. Keller (1923–2008), chairman of Standard Oil Company of California
 George Frederick Keller (1846–?), political cartoonist
 George S. Keller (1881–?), clergyman and an American football player and coach